Raj Kumar Yadav is an Indian politician. He was elected from Dhanwar constituency as a member of Communist Party of India (Marxist–Leninist) Liberation in 2014. Yadav also contested the 2019 Jharkhand Legislative Assembly election but lost to Babulal Marandi.

References

Communist Party of India (Marxist–Leninist) Liberation politicians
Jharkhand MLAs 2014–2019
People from Giridih district
Living people
Year of birth missing (living people)